is a 1955 Japanese film directed by Teinosuke Kinugasa.

Cast 
 Kazuo Hasegawa
 Ayako Wakao
 Hideo Takamatsu as Engineer
 Raizo Ichikawa as Sofu Yamamura

References

External links 
 
 
 http://www.raizofan.net/eng/emovie1/emovie9.htm

Japanese black-and-white films
1955 films
Films directed by Teinosuke Kinugasa
Daiei Film films
Japanese drama films
1955 drama films
1950s Japanese films